Corey Parker Robinson (born February 9, 1975) is an American actor.

Career 
Robinson is best known for his role in the HBO program The Wire as Detective Leander Sydnor. He also appeared in episodes of The Corner, Homicide, and ER. In the daytime soap opera Guiding Light, he played the role of Remy Boudreau.

Filmography

Film

Television

External links

1975 births
Living people
American male film actors
American male television actors
Male actors from Washington, D.C.
DeMatha Catholic High School alumni
20th-century American male actors
21st-century American male actors